Salinaria is a genus of snout moths. It was described by Rebel in 1901, and contains the species Salinaria diffusella. It is found in Russia and Kazakhstan.

References

Phycitinae
Monotypic moth genera
Moths of Asia
Pyralidae genera